North–South Highway may refer to road: 

 North–South Highway (Armenia) in Armenia
 North–South Expressway (Malaysia) in Malaysia
 North–South Expressway, Singapore in Singapore
 North–South Highway (Prague) in Prague, Czech Republic